Christos Tserentzoulias (born ) is a Greek male  track cyclist. He was member of Greece Track cycling team from 2001 to 2006 and 2011 to 2014. He won 27 medals in Greek Track cycling Championships.  Eight Balcan Championships Medals.

He competed in International Gran Prix, European Championships, World Cups & World Championships Representing Greece National Team. He graduated from National and Kapodistrian University of Athens in the department of the School of Physical Education and Sport Science.

Currently working as fitness trainer, indoor cycling instructor, online cycling coaching & coaching member of Volikakis Christos team towards Tokyo 2020 Olympic Games.

He competed in the team sprint event at the 2012 UCI Track Cycling World Championships.

References

External links
 Profile at cyclingarchives.com

1984 births
Living people
Greek track cyclists
Greek male cyclists
Place of birth missing (living people)
Sportspeople from Aigio
21st-century Greek people